The Canon PowerShot G3 X is a large sensor digital bridge camera announced by Canon on June 18, 2015. It marks Canon's entry into this product category, alongside competitors such as the Panasonic Lumix DMC-FZ1000, Sony Cyber-shot RX10 and RX10 II.

It has the longest focal length zoom range of any Powershot G-Series, from 24-600mm (35mm equivalent) with a maximum aperture of f/2.8 at widest, decreasing to f/5.6 at 600mm. In terms of overall specification it is the most capable of the current-production G-series cameras but this comes at the expense of overall size and weight - it is also the largest and heaviest of the series.

It shares the same 1" sensor seen in the Canon G7X as well as both the Sony RX100-III and RX10 cameras. Patent JP 2016-31419 appears to describe the lens used in G3X.

Features
 3.5mm microphone jack for external microphones or recorders.
 3.5mm jack for headphones
 PAL/NTSC video output
  3:2 aspect ratio LCD monitor, 1.62 million dots
 Live view mode
 Built-in flash
 Auto, Continuous, Servo AF and Manual Focus modes
 Internal monaural speaker, stereo microphone
 Three metering modes, Evaluative, Center Weighted Average & Spot
 ±3 stops in 1/3-stop increment Exposure Compensation, dedicated dial
 sRGB colour space
 ISO 125–12,800
 Continuous drive up to 5.9 frame/s
 SD, SDHC, and SDXC memory card file storage
 Raw and large, superfine JPEG simultaneous recording
 USB 2.0, HDMI control (CEC)
 Approximate weight  with battery and card
 NB-10L battery, rated at approx. 300 shots in normal usage/400 shots in ECO mode

References

http://www.dpreview.com/products/canon/compacts/canon_g3x/specifications

G3 X
Cameras introduced in 2015